A federal republic is a federation of states with a republican form of government. At its core, the literal meaning of the word republic when used to reference a form of government means: "a country that is governed by elected representatives and by an elected leader (such as a president) rather than by a monarch".

In a federal republic, a division of powers exists between the federal government and the government of the individual subdivisions. While each federal republic manages this division of powers differently, common matters relating to security and defense, and monetary policy are usually handled at the federal level, while matters such as infrastructure maintenance and education policy are usually handled at the regional or local level. However, views differ on what issues should be a federal competence, and subdivisions usually have sovereignty in some matters where the federal government does not have jurisdiction. A federal republic is thus best defined in contrast to a unitary republic, whereby the central government has complete sovereignty over all aspects of political life. This more decentralized structure helps to explain the tendency for more populous countries to operate as federal republics. Most federal republics codify the division of powers between orders of government in a written constitutional document.

The political differences between a federal republic and other federal states, especially federal monarchies under a parliamentary system of government, are largely a matter of legal form rather than political substance, as most federal states are democratic in structure if not practice with checks and balances. However, some federal monarchies, such as the United Arab Emirates are based upon principles other than democracy.

Otherwise, federal states primarily contrast with unitary states, where the central government retains many of the powers that are delegated to the subdivisions in federal republics. While there are exceptions, the overall tendency is for federal republics to be larger, more populous, and more internally heterogeneous than unitary states, with such larger size and internal heterogeneity being more manageable in a federal system than in a unitary one.

Contemporary

Historical

See also
 Form of government
 List of republics
 Federal monarchy

Notes and references 

 
Republic
Republicanism